Bentley Wood High School is an all-girls secondary academy school in Stanmore, Harrow, England.

History
BWHS was originally called Heriots Wood Grammar School.

About the school
Bentley Wood High School is a multi-cultural girls' comprehensive school which receives students from a wide range of primary schools. The majority of students transfer from Harrow Primary schools but students are also admitted from out of borough.

Bentley Wood High School specializes in Maths, Science, and Computing. It has been nationally recognised for its exceptional 2015 performance by the Schools, Students
and Teachers network (SSAT). The school was declared outstanding by Ofsted, and has been in the top 1% of schools nationally for three years. It was recognized as the 7th highest school in the country in 2015 for student progress.

The sixth form centre is part of the Harrow Sixth Form Collegiate.

School life
There are now four houses: Earth, Air, Fire and Water, named after the four classical natural elements. Each house has its own logo designed by students at the school.

Admissions
The academy complies with the requirements of the Funding Agreement and the School Admissions Code, and recognises that its ‘relevant area’ is the London Borough of Harrow.

Notable former pupils

 Camilla Beeput, TV & theatre actress
 Shami Chakrabarti, Shadow Attorney General for England and Wales, appointed 6 October 2016
 Ruby McGregor-Smith, Baroness McGregor-Smith, CEO of Mitie Group PLC & Life Peer in The House of Lord
 Abi Oyepitan, 100m sprinter
 Carla Marie Williams, songwriter

Location
It is situated just north of the A410, in the parish of All Saints, Harrow Weald, just south of Bentley Wood Nature Reserve. It can be reached via Masefield Avenue.

See also
 List of schools in Harrow

References

External links
 
 Edubase
 

Academies in the London Borough of Harrow
Girls' schools in London
Secondary schools in the London Borough of Harrow